Melastiza is a genus of fungi in the family Pyronemataceae.

External links
Index Fungorum

Pyronemataceae
Pezizales genera
Taxa named by Jean Louis Émile Boudier
Taxa described in 1885